Alsace is a cultural and historical region in eastern France and until 2016 an administrative région of France.

Alsace may also refer to:

In geography

Australia 
 Alsace, Queensland, a locality in the Central Highlands Region

Europe 
 Alsace wine region
 Alsace-Lorraine
 Duchy of Alsace

North America 
 Alsace, California
 Alsace Township, Berks County, Pennsylvania

Other
 Alsace (automobile), an American automobile
 Alsace wine
 Alsace (film), a 1916 French film
 Alsace, an Aquitaine class frigate of French navy
 Alsace class battleship, a French project in 1939, not built

See also
 Alsatian (disambiguation)